Huhoini is a location in Kenya's Central Province headed by Mrs Muriithi Who is the area Chief
.

References 

Populated places in Central Province (Kenya)